The Boyer River is a tributary of the Missouri River,  long, in western Iowa in the United States. Most reaches of the river's course have been straightened and channelized.

The Boyer River is named for a settler who hunted and trapped in the watershed before the time of Lewis and Clark. Explorers, including Lewis and Clark, John James Audubon, and Prince Maximilian zu Wied-Neuwied, navigated through the region near the mouth of the Boyer as they traveled up the Missouri River. This area is now part of the Boyer Chute National Wildlife Refuge (NWR). This was originally an island of sand and sediment deposited in the Missouri River by the Boyer River. Gradually, the Missouri River eroded a major channel (chute) through the sediment; this came to be known as Boyer Chute, and was the preferred channel used by explorers and traders until the Missouri eventually changed its course.

Course
The Boyer River rises near Storm Lake in southwestern Buena Vista County and initially flows southwardly into Sac County. In southern Sac County it turns southwestward and flows through Crawford, Harrison and Pottawattamie Counties, past the towns of Deloit, Denison, Arion, Dow City, Dunlap, Woodbine, Logan and Missouri Valley.

At Denison, the Boyer collects the East Boyer River, which rises in northwestern Carroll County and flows southwestwardly past Vail. In southwestern Harrison County, it collects the Willow River.

See also

List of Iowa rivers

References

Boyer Chute NWR
Columbia Gazetteer of North America entry
DeLorme (1998).  Iowa Atlas & Gazetteer. Yarmouth, Maine: DeLorme. .
, retrieved 4 February 2006
, retrieved 4 February 2006

Rivers of Iowa
Tributaries of the Missouri River
Rivers of Buena Vista County, Iowa
Rivers of Carroll County, Iowa
Rivers of Crawford County, Iowa
Rivers of Harrison County, Iowa
Rivers of Pottawattamie County, Iowa
Rivers of Sac County, Iowa